The 2022 Bad Homburg Open was a women's professional tennis tournament played on outdoor grass courts at the TC Bad Homburg in Bad Homburg, Germany, from 19 June to 25 June 2022. It was the second edition of the Bad Homburg Open and was classified as a WTA 250 event on the 2022 WTA Tour.

Champions

Singles 

  Caroline Garcia def.  Bianca Andreescu 6–7(5–7), 6–4, 6–4

This is Garcia's first singles title of the year and eighth of her career.

Doubles 

  Eri Hozumi /  Makoto Ninomiya def.  Alicja Rosolska /  Erin Routliffe 6–4, 6–7(5–7), [10–5]

Point distribution

WTA singles main-draw entrants

Seeds

1 Rankings are as of 13 June 2022.

Other entrants
The following players received wildcards into the main draw:
  Sabine Lisicki
  Tatjana Maria
  Jule Niemeier 

The following players received entry from the qualifying draw:
  Anastasia Gasanova
  Yuliya Hatouka
  Kamilla Rakhimova
  Katie Swan

The following players received entry as lucky losers:
  Misaki Doi
  Tamara Korpatsch

Withdrawals
Before the tournament
  Ekaterina Alexandrova → replaced by  Caroline Garcia
  Victoria Azarenka → replaced by  Claire Liu
  Belinda Bencic → replaced by  Tamara Korpatsch
  Veronika Kudermetova → replaced by  Misaki Doi
  Aryna Sabalenka → replaced by  Greet Minnen

WTA doubles main-draw entrants

Seeds

1 Rankings are as of 13 June 2022.

Other entrants
The following pair received a wildcard into the doubles main draw:
  Sloane Stephens /  Katie Swan

The following pair received entry as alternates:
  Alena Fomina-Klotz /  Anastasia Gasanova

Withdrawals
  Natela Dzalamidze /  Kamilla Rakhimova → replaced by  Julia Lohoff /  Kamilla Rakhimova
  Han Xinyun /  Alexandra Panova → replaced by  Han Xinyun /  Renata Voráčová
  Rosalie van der Hoek /  Alison Van Uytvanck → replaced by  Alena Fomina-Klotz /  Anastasia Gasanova

References

External links
 Official website

Bad Homburg Open
Bad Homburg Open
Bad Homburg Open
2022 in German tennis
Porsch